Frederick U. Conard High School is a public high school in West Hartford, in the U.S. state of Connecticut. It opened in 1957, and was named after Frederick Underwood Conard, president of Niles-Bement-Pond Company and chairman of the local Board of Education when plans for the school were approved. Conard is one of two West Hartford public high schools, the other being Hall High School.

History 
Conard's first classes were held on September 4, 1957. While Conard was originally designed to accommodate 1,100 students, it now accommodates 2,870.

On February 23, 2015, fans of Conard and Hall High School basketball were involved in a physical conflict at their annual end-of-season rivalry game.

At the end of the 2021-2022 School Season, the students, staff, and Board of Education of West Hartford Public Schools were prompted to vote for mascots which Conard and Hall High Schools would change theirs to, respectively. For Conard, "Red Wolves" won with a substantially higher vote.

Academics
Blue Ribbon School in 1984-85.

Athletics
Conard High School is part of the Central Connecticut Conference (CCC), competing in the West Division. The Board of Education added varsity sports for girls in January 1972.

Conard's Gavin Sherry was three time Gatorade POY (Player of the year) recipient.

The boys cross country team won the CIAC Class LL title and runner up at the CIAC state open championship in the fall of 2019.

The boys ice hockey team won the CIAC Division II ice hockey championships in 1985 and 1996.

Notable alumni 

David Naughton, class of 1969, actor (An American Werewolf in London)
James Naughton, actor, winner of the Tony Award for Best Performance by a Leading Actor in a Musical (1990, 1997)
Robert Romanus, actor Fast Times at Ridgemont High, class of 1974
Jimmy Shea, class of 1987, 2002 Olympic gold medal winner
Matt Sinatro, class of 1978, Major League Baseball player and coach
Kevin Galvin, business/health care advocate (CVS)
Marcus Camby, professional basketball player (transferred before graduating)
Jack Sonni, class of 1972, rhythm guitarist for Dire Straits
Peter Dante, actor ("Grandma's Boy," "Big Daddy," "Mr. Deeds," "Little Nicky")
Justin R. Clark, class of 1993, Director of the White House Office of Intergovernmental Affairs
Brett H. McGurk, class of 1991; United States National Security Council, Director for Iraq
Mike Joy, auto racing announcer
Seth Waxman, class of 1969, Solicitor General of the United States
Paul Lieberstein, class of 1985, actor (The Office) 
Nancy Dow, class of 1958, actress, mother of Jennifer Aniston

References

External links 
 

Buildings and structures in West Hartford, Connecticut
Schools in Hartford County, Connecticut
Educational institutions established in 1957
Public high schools in Connecticut
1957 establishments in Connecticut